The MF 2000 (officially called the MF 01) is a model of steel-wheeled electrical multiple units used on Paris's Metro system. The cars first arrived in December 2007 and delivery was completed in 2015. RATP ordered 160 trains or 800 cars in 2001, to replace the aging MF 67. It is used on Lines 2, 5, and 9.

The MF 01 was first introduced to the press on 17 June 2005 but it would not be until January 2006 that the first trains would undergo testing on the system. Commercial service on Line 2 began on 11 June 2008, with all of Line 2 being equipped with the new rolling stock by March 2011. Testing quickly commenced on Line 5, where two trains were initially deployed. Commercial service on Line 5 began on 15 June 2011, with nearly 25 trains in service as of April 2012.

On 9 February 2011, the STIF voted to purchase MF 2000 stock for Line 9 at a cost of €330 million. Deliveries took place in 2013, after all of the stock was delivered to Line 5, and will continue through 2016. The features of the Line 9 trains will be virtually identical to the trains on Lines 2 and 5, including the air conditioning systems. However, the trains feature a new joint RATP/STIF exterior livery that is based on the MI 09 commuter rail rolling stock on the RER A, marking the first time that the co-branded RATP/STIF livery is seen on the Metro. The first train (#096) for Line 9 was delivered in June 2013 and began revenue service along Line 5 in July 2013. The train was then prepared for revenue service on Line 9 in early October 2013, going into revenue service on 21 October 2013.

Conception 
With many of the MF 67 trains approaching 35 years old on Lines 2, 5, and 9, the RATP determined that a new class of steel-wheel rolling stock was needed. Due to changes in European legislation regarding competition, the RATP was required to change the way it awarded bids. This resulted in the RATP launching an open bid where numerous firms could take part.

The winning consortium of four train manufacturers, namely Alstom, Bombardier, Technicatome and CSEE was chosen to manufacture the MF 2000 stock at a cost of €800 million. It was the first time in history that the RATP has assigned four manufacturers to manufacture different components of the train cars. This process delayed the delivery by a year due to poor collaboration between the four companies, but the RATP has seen a drop in costs.

Description 
The exterior design of the MF 01 was the result of a design competition, and the winning design is similar to the MP 89. The interior also looks similar to MP 89's interior, carrying on features like interconnecting gangways between cars, but with new security features added. The trains are the first rolling stock on the Paris Metro to include air-conditioning. Additionally, the MF 2000 consumes 30% less energy than its older counterparts due to innovations in traction and braking systems.

Currently, pre-production train #001 contains the Dilidam multimedia system. Although all of the MF 01 trains are configured in a way so that the system can easily be installed, high cost has delayed implementation to all trainsets. The same train, in August 2014, became the first set to be repainted in the hybrid RATP/STIF livery and permanently reassigned to Line 9, having originally ran on Line 2.

Deliveries to Line 9 
Unlike the previous deliveries of the MF 01 stock trains to Lines 2 and 5; deliveries to Line 9 will consist of placing trains into revenue service along Line 5 for a short time before being moved over to Line 9 for revenue service. The ongoing reconstruction of the Boulogne workshops along Line 9 prevents any mass cascading of rolling stock to occur, since the Auteuil workshops, which Line 10 temporarily shares with Line 9, are not equipped to handle maintenance operations for the MF 01 rolling stock, and thus heavy maintenance work must be done at the Bobigny workshops along Line 5.

Formations 
In date of 25 December 2021:
 173 MF01 trainsets were in service and were formed as shown below, with three motored ("M") cars and two non-powered trailer ("T") cars.
 One trainset was scrapped in 2017 (accident).

As of 1 March 2022, 45 trainsets were allocated to Charonne Depot (Paris)  for use on Line 2, in a 5-car formation (3M2T).

As of 1 March 2022, 52 trainsets were allocated to Bobigny Depot (Paris)  for use on Line 5, in a 5-car formation (3M2T).

As of 1 March 2022, 74 trainsets were allocated to Boulogne Depot, for use on Line 9, in a 5-car formation (3M2T).

 VVVF: Inverters OniX IGBT–VVVF
 CP: Air compressor
 SIV: Static inverter

Gallery

References 
This article incorporates information from the corresponding article on the French Wikipedia.

Paris Métro rolling stock
Electric multiple units of France
750 V DC multiple units
Alstom multiple units
Bombardier Transportation multiple units